David Lewis Yewdall (October 30, 1950 – July 4, 2017) was an American supervising sound editor. He worked with Roger Corman on Battle Beyond the Stars and as the co-supervising sound editor on Talvisota. He published a book about the profession in 2007, Practical Art of Motion Picture Sound, which was called a "must-read for all students of film." In 1996, he became a member of the board of NightPro Technologies Inc (NTI), a sound production company from Provo, Utah. He taught editing and sound at the University of North Carolina School of the Arts
until June 2016.

Publications

Death
Yewdall died on July 4, 2017, in Winston-Salem, North Carolina from pancreatic cancer, aged 66.

Awards and recognition
In 1988 Yewdall was nominated for an Emmy Award for "Outstanding Sound Editing for a Miniseries or a Special" for his work on The Taking of Flight 847: The Uli Derickson Story.

References

External links

1950 births
2017 deaths
American sound designers
American sound editors
People from Springfield, Missouri